Events in the year 2020 in Rwanda.

Incumbents 

 President: Paul Kagame
 Prime Minister: Édouard Ngirente

Events 

 14 March – The first case of COVID-19 in the country was confirmed.
 31 May – The country confirmed its first COVID-19 death.
 26 August – Rwandan and Burundian delegations, led by Brigadier General Vincent Nyakarundi and Colonel Ernest Musaba, respectively, met in Nemba to discuss longstanding security and trade issues. The meeting was facilitated by Colonel Leon Mahoungou of the Expanded Joint Verification Mechanism, an element of the International Conference on the Great Lakes Region.
21 December – Rwanda bolsters its security forces in the Central African Republic.

Deaths
31 August – Édouard Karemera, 69, politician and convicted war criminal.

See also

2020 in East Africa
COVID-19 pandemic in Africa

References 

 
2020s in Rwanda
Years of the 21st century in Rwanda
Rwanda
Rwanda